First United Methodist Church is a historic church at 923 Roland in Chariton, Iowa.

It was built during 1899-1900 and was added to the National Register of Historic Places in 2002.

It replaced an earlier Methodist church on the site, a brick Greek Revival-style church that was built in 1864.  It was deemed significant as "a fine, unaltered example of turn of the century Gothic Revival design by well known Illinois architect, Samuel A. Bullard".

References

Chariton, Iowa
United Methodist churches in Iowa
Churches on the National Register of Historic Places in Iowa
Gothic Revival church buildings in Iowa
Churches completed in 1899
Buildings and structures in Lucas County, Iowa
National Register of Historic Places in Lucas County, Iowa